Reice is a name. Notable people with this name include:

 Naomi Reice Buchwald (born 1944), American judge
 Reice Charles-Cook (born 1994), English football player
 Reice Hamel (1920–1986), American sound technician
 Rich Reice, American American football player